Telostylinus lineolatus is a species of fly from the genus Telostylinus. The species was originally described by Christian Rudolph Wilhelm Wiedemann in 1830

Distribution
Widespread Oriental and Australasian.

References

Taxa named by Christian Rudolph Wilhelm Wiedemann
Neriidae
Diptera of Asia
Diptera of Australasia
Insects described in 1830